Jim Chim Sui-man (born 6 May 1965) is a Hong Kong-based stage actor and comedian.

Biography
Jim Chim, Associate Artistic Director of Theatre Ensemble, co-founded the company with Olivia Yan in 1993. Since then, he has been performing and directing performances that have been critically acclaimed and popular with Hong Kong audiences. He is widely recognized for his distinctive brand of humour, physical movement and performance style.

He was presented with the first Drama Development Fellowship from Hong Kong Arts Development Council Drama Committee in 2000. He also received the Best Supporting Actor Award and the Best Actor Award from the Hong Kong Federation of Drama Society in 1998 and 2000, respectively.

Apart from creative and performing achievements, Chim also devoted himself to theatre training and established the PIP-Pleasure In Play artistic concept. In 2003, he founded the PIP School, not only providing professional training in performing arts, but also further conveying the PIP style of living. He has been invited to conduct acting and movement workshops for local and overseas universities and professional arts organizations, including Ecole Philippe Gaulier (UK), The Theatre Practice (Singapore), National Drama Company of China, U-Theatre (Taiwan) and the very first full-time theatre school in Tokyo established by New National Theatre (Japan).

Chim has worked with both foreign and local artists, including David Glass and Meng Jin Hui. In recent years, he has also been highly involved in local cinema and has appeared in movies such as You Shoot, I Shoot, Men Suddenly in Black, Isabella, McDull, the Alumni and Driving Miss Wealthy.  For the last, he was a Best Supporting Actor nominee at the 24th Hong Kong Film Awards. He also lent his voice in various Cantonese Chinese dubs of Hollywood films, most notably as adult Simba in The Lion King (1994) and as Dave Douglas in The Shaggy Dog (2006).

In 2004, Chim was honored with the “Men of Vision 2004” award by Royal Salute and was invited by the U.S. Department of State’s Bureau of Educational and Cultural Affairs to visit the United States in August 2006 as a grantee of its cultural exchange program, the  International Visitor Leadership Program (IVLP).

Filmography

Stage appearance
 2007-2008 Man-tiger
 2007-2008 My Life as a TV

Education
 Po On Commercial Association Primary School
 The Hong Kong Academy for Performing Arts

References

External links
  official website
  jim chim @ pinkwork city, sound & video 
 
 Hong Kong Cinemagic entry

Hong Kong male comedians
Hong Kong male film actors
1965 births
Living people
Alumni of The Hong Kong Academy for Performing Arts